This is a list of dishes found in Middle Eastern cuisine, a generalized term collectively referring to the cuisines of the Middle East and the Maghreb region. The Middle East is home to numerous different cultural and ethnic groups. This diversity is also reflected in the many local culinary traditions in choice of ingredients, style of preparation, and cooking techniques.

Middle Eastern dishes

See also
List of African dishes

References

Middle Eastern cuisine